The 2009 Evolution Championship Series (commonly referred to as Evo 2009 or EVO 2009) was a fighting game event held in Rio Las Vegas on July 17–19. The event featured major tournaments for various fighting games, including Super Street Fighter IV and Marvel vs. Capcom 2.

Event overview

Evo 2009 was held on July 17–19 in the Rio All Suite Hotel and Casino. It was the biggest instance of the event up to that point, featuring over 1,000 competitors for its Street Fighter IV tournament. 23,000 people watched the event through a live feed. Capcom made the latest version of Tatsunoko vs Capcom available to be played at the event, and revealed their first public build of Marvel vs. Capcom 2 for PlayStation 3 and Xbox 360.:2 Bandai Namco had set up a handful of TVs for attendees to demo the to-be-released Tekken 6, and Aksys Games held a signery.  Street Fighter players Mike Ross and Mike Watson interviewed early 1990s Street Fighter 2 champion Tomo Ohira. The organizers of the event, Tony and Tom Cannon, were interviewed by Victor Ratliff, who bestowed the two brothers the "Cannon award" in recognition of their work organizing Evo, running the website Shuryuken, and creating a GGPO netcode that allowed the community to play games such as BlazBlue online.:5

Mad Catz-brand arcade sticks began hitting the market in 2008, and reached unprecedented popularity among the fighting game community after the release of a Street Fighter IV range of products in 2009. Mad Catz employee Mark Julio said he was blown away seeing the community "flooded" with Mad Catz Street Fighter IV arcade sticks at Evo 2009.

Tournaments

Evo 2009 featured major tournaments for various fighting games, such as 1v1 tournaments of Street Fighter IV, Marvel vs. Capcom 2, Soulcalibur IV, and Guilty Gear XX Accent Core, both a 1v1 and 2v2 tournament of Super Street Fighter II Turbo HD Remix, a 2v2 tournament of Street Fighter III: Third Strike, and a 1v1 invitational tournament of the then-unlocalized gameTatsunoko vs. Capcom.

Nearly half of the "bring your own console"-area at Evo 2009 was dedicated to Super Smash Bros. Brawl tournaments, run by AllisBrawl.com. Unlike the previous year, the Brawl tournaments at Evo 2009 were held with a community-defined ruleset, which was favored by the competitors. Other side-tournaments at the event were held by companies such as Bandai Namco and AkSys Games, who received a lot of support from Evolution's organizers. Unlike previous years, both the BlazBlue and Tekken 6 tournaments were held on the final day of the event, so they could be displayed on the big screen alongside the Marvel vs. Capcom and Street Fighter IV finals.:4

Tournaments held on a PlayStation 3 set-up experienced various technical difficulties, such as wireless controller synchronization issues, dangling cables of wired controllers disconnecting during matches, and software glitches. Delays were also a big issue during the event, with some tournaments starting much later than planned.:6

Street Fighter IV finals

The Evo 2009 Street Fighter IV finals were defined by Justin Wong and Daigo Umehara. Wong had lost to Umehara two times before; once at the GameStop tournament in San Francisco earlier that year, and before that during their renowned match at Evo 2004. Wong lost to Umehara again at Evo 2009, but made his way to the grand finals of the tournament through the losers' bracket to meet Umehara again. Justin Wong was playing with Abel against Daigo Umehara's Ryu, but after losing his first game in the grand finals, Wong switched to the character Balrog; a character he had never been publicly seen playing before. Wong won three consecutive games with Balrog, earning him his first set and a bracket reset.

In the last set of the grand finals, Wong and Umehara both won two matches, and the title hinged on the fifth and final match of the set. Both players were throwing out safe crouching attacks from a distance in order to chip away at the other's vitality with minimal risk. Wong cautiously played more aggressively as the match continued, but Umehara gained and retained the lead by parrying and punishing several of Balrog's "dash punches." In the end, both characters had very little vitality left and Wong decided to jump in for the final blow, a move Umehara countered with a jump-kick to Balrog's chest. Umehara defeated Wong again and took home the $7,000 USD cash prize.

Results

References

Evolution Championship Series
2009 in sports in Nevada
2009 in esports